The 1998 St. Louis Rams season was the team’s 61st year with the National Football League (NFL) and the fourth season in St. Louis. It was the second year for head coach Dick Vermeil. The team failed to improve on its 5–11 record from 1997, and instead finished the season 4–12 and missed the playoffs for the ninth consecutive season, during which they had compiled a league-worst 45–99 record. 

Despite all of this, the Rams showed signs of life during the season when they beat playoff teams such as the New York Jets (who would make the AFC Championship game during the season) and the New England Patriots (who would make a wild card). Some skeptics claim that those two wins helped them build signs of strong life into next season, when they won Super Bowl XXXIV against the Tennessee Titans. Despite the Rams finishing 4-12, six of those losses were only by a touchdown or less.

Offseason

NFL Draft

Roster

Regular season

Schedule

Standings

References

External links 
 1998 St. Louis Rams at Pro-Football-Reference.com

St. Louis Rams
St. Louis Rams seasons
St Lou